The Brumaire-class submarines were built for the French Navy prior to World War I. There were sixteen vessels in this class, of the Laubeuf type.

All saw action during the First World War, with three boats lost.

Naming
The French Navy built 34 Laubeuf-type submarines between 1906 and 1911. These are usually described as two classes, of which the Brumaire class was one, the other being the Pluviôse  class. 
(Another source treats the vessels as one group, divided by the yards that built them).
The boats had two naming schemes; the earlier vessels were named after the months of the French Revolutionary calendar, and the later ones after French scientists. However, apart from the name ship of the class, only two were named after months; the remaining thirteen boats of the Brumaire class were named for scientists.

Design
The Brumaire class were Laubeuf type submarines, following the Laubeuf standard design of double hull and dual propulsion systems (as were the Pluviôse class). 
The Brumaire boats had electric motors for underwater propulsion, and are usually listed as having diesel engines for surface propulsion, though in practice this was mixed. While most had diesels several of the earlier boats had steam engines.

Construction
The Brumaire class were ordered in the 1906 programme and the first vessels were laid down the same year. However construction proceeded more slowly than the Pluviôse boats, and the first of the class,  was not launched until four years later, priority being given to the Pluviôse boats. The boats were built at three of the French Navy’s dockyards, at the Arsenals of Cherbourg, Rochefort and Toulon. The first of the class, Brumaire, was launched in April 1911, and the last, Franklin in March 1913.

Armament
The Brumaire-class submarines were armed with  torpedoes, of which eight were carried. They had one 17.7 inch torpedo tube mounted in the bow, with one torpedo loaded and one carried as a reload, and six carried externally. 
Of these four were in Drzewiecki drop collars and two in external cradles alongside the conning tower.

Service history
The Brumaire class were acknowledged to be good sea boats and saw action throughout the First World War on patrol and close blockade duty. Of the sixteen built, four were lost in action. Two vessels ( and ) were mined; another was sunk by aircraft, the first incidence of such a loss. The fourth,  was lost attempting to penetrate the Austro-Hungarian naval base at Pola. She was later raised by the Austrians and put into service by them, but was returned after the Austrian surrender.

Ships

See also 
List of submarines of France

Notes

Citations

Bibliography

External links

French Submarines: 1863 - Now
Sous-marins Français 1863 -  (French)
u-boat-laboratorium.com article on Curie (Q87)

Submarine classes
 
 
Ship classes of the French Navy